HMS Scorpion was an ironclad turret ship built by John Laird Sons & Company, at Birkenhead, England. She was one of two sister ships secretly ordered from the Laird shipyard in 1862 by the Confederate States of America.

Her true ownership was concealed by the fiction that she was being built as the Egyptian warship El Tousson. She was to have been named CSS North Carolina upon delivery to the Confederacy. Her sister was built under the false name El Monassir and was to have been renamed CSS Mississippi. In October 1863, a few months after their launch and before they could be completed, the UK Government seized the two ironclads.

Scorpion had a long Royal Navy career, until she was lost in the North Atlantic in 1903.

Design and description
North Carolina and her sister were intended, together with other warships, to break the Federal blockade of Confederate coastal cities and to hold some Northern cities for ransom. They displaced . The hull was divided by 12 watertight bulkheads and the ships had a double bottom beneath the engine and boiler rooms. Their crew consisted of 152 officers and ratings.

The Scorpion-class ships had two horizontal direct-acting steam engines, built by Lairds, each driving a single propeller shaft, using steam provided by four tubular boilers. They were barque-rigged with three masts. The funnel was made semi-retractable to reduce wind resistance while under sail.

No ordnance had been ordered by the Confederates before the ships were seized in 1863, but in British service they mounted a pair of 9-inch rifled muzzle-loading guns in each turret. The guns could fire both solid shot and explosive shells. According to Parkes, going from full depression to full elevation supposedly took one hour in smooth water and with an even keel!

The armour protection of the turrets was quite elaborate. The  iron plates were bolted to the outside using bolts that ran through to the interior iron "skin". The area around the gun ports was reinforced by 4.5-inch plates to give a total thickness of 10 inches. The turret roof consisted of T-shaped beams covered by  iron plates.

Construction and career

Commissioned in July 1865, Scorpion was assigned to the Channel Fleet until 1869, with time out for a refit that reduced her sailing rig from a bark to a schooner. In late 1869, she moved to Bermuda for coast and harbour defence service. Scorpion remained there for over three decades before being removed from the effective list. Scorpion was sunk as a target in 1901 but raised the next year and sold in February 1903. She was lost at sea while under tow to the U.S., where she was to be scrapped.

Notes

References

 
 
 
 
 
 

 

Scorpion-class ironclads
Ships built on the River Mersey
1863 ships
Victorian-era battleships of the United Kingdom
Ships sunk as targets
Maritime incidents in 1901
Maritime incidents in 1903
Shipwrecks in the Atlantic Ocean